Wa is a letter of related and vertically oriented alphabets used to write Mongolic and Tungusic languages.

Mongolian language 

 Transcribes Chakhar ; Transliterated into Cyrillic with the letter .
 Used to transcribe foreign words (originally for v in Sanskrit  /va/). Transcribes /w/ in Tibetan ཝ /wa/; Old Uyghur and Chinese loanwords.

 Derived from Old Uyghur bet, and waw (before a separated vowel).
 Produced with  using the Windows Mongolian keyboard layout.
 In the Mongolian Unicode block,  comes after .

Notes

References 

Articles containing Mongolian script text
Mongolic letters
Mongolic languages
Tungusic languages